Smilisca manisorum, or masked tree frog, is a frog in the family Hylidae, endemic to Costa Rica, Panama, Honduras and Nicaragua.  It lives in coastal forests.  Scientists have seen it as high as 540 meters above sea level.

See also
New Granada cross-banded tree frog

References

manisorum
Amphibians described in 1954
Frogs of North America